Mahesh Bhattacharya Homoeopathic Medical College and Hospital is a homeopathic medical college and hospital in Howrah, West Bengal, India.  It was established in 1967 and is one of the oldest homeopathic medical colleges in India. The college is affiliated with the West Bengal University of Health Sciences and recognized by the Central Council of Homoeopathy (CCH), Ministry of Ayush. It offers B.H.M.S. (Bachelor in Homoeopathic Medicine & Surgery) and M.D. (Homoeopathy) courses.

See also

References

External links
Official Website

1967 establishments in West Bengal
Educational institutions established in 1967
Homeopathic hospitals
Hospitals established in 1967
Hospitals in West Bengal
Universities and colleges in Howrah district
Homoeopathic Medical Colleges in West Bengal
Affiliates of West Bengal University of Health Sciences